Hawkeye Point is the highest natural point in Iowa at . The high ground lies  due south of an old silo.

The land that includes the highpoint was donated by the Sterler family, who worked this land for many decades, to Osceola County with the stipulation that the land be turned into a park.  Osceola County, through its Economic Development Commission and Hawkeye Point Committee, has removed a few structures that were deemed to be hazardous to public safety including the old hog feed bunker at the highpoint site and a few small barns. They have erected an informational kiosk which highlights the family and the county and features a display of license plates from the 50 states sent in over the years to the Sterlers.

There are a flagpole, picnic bench, tile mosaic, several granite markers, and five tall posts with signs pointing to the other 49 state highpoints, each with the correct distance noted. The local 4-H group and high school youths contributed a great deal to this effort.

The Highpointers Foundation, a non-profit charity set up to benefit privately owned state highpoints, has provided much of the funding for the renovations at Hawkeye Point.

See also

Outline of Iowa
Index of Iowa-related articles
List of U.S. states by elevation

References

External links
 
 Highpointers Foundation

Geography of Iowa
Geography of Osceola County, Iowa
Highest points of U.S. states